The Kayseri Subregion (Turkish: Kayseri Alt Bölgesi) (TR72) is a statistical subregion in Turkey.

Provinces 

 Kayseri Province (TR721)
 Sivas Province (TR722)
 Yozgat Province (TR723)

See also 

 NUTS of Turkey

External links 
 TURKSTAT

Sources 
 ESPON Database

Statistical subregions of Turkey